Iryna Gayvoronska (born 4 January 1983) is a Ukrainian synchronized swimmer who competed in the women's duet at the 2004 Summer Olympics.

References

1983 births
Living people
Ukrainian synchronized swimmers
Olympic synchronized swimmers of Ukraine
Synchronized swimmers at the 2004 Summer Olympics
21st-century Ukrainian women